Airut:aamujen is the fourth full-length album by Tenhi and the second part in their Airut-saga. The album was initially released in 2004 through the band's own label, Utustudio, under the name Harmaa instead of Tenhi. In October 2006 the album was re-released under the name Tenhi through the German label Prophecy Productions.

Airut:aamujen ("The Harbinger of Dawns" in Finnish) differs from other Tenhi albums by being nearly entirely played on piano, bass and drums (acoustic guitar and synthesizer make only brief and subtle appearances and are not even mentioned in the booklet). The band has stated that the song Kielo on Tenhi's minialbum  (the first part of the Airut-saga) was the basis for the mood and style of Airut:aamujen.

Track listing 
 "Saapuminen | Emerging" ("Arrival") – 2:24
 "Seitsensarvi | Grey Shine of June" ("Sevenhorn") – 4:35
 "Lävitseni kaikkeen | Thru Me and into Everything" ("Through Me into Everything") – 5:44
 "Luopumisen laulu | Eloign" ("The Song of Relinquishing") – 5:39
 "Kuvajainen | Apparition" – 7:01
 "Oikea sointi | Lay Down a Tune" ("Right Tune") – 4:11
 "Kahluu | Fury Revived" ("Fording") – 8:18
 "Hiensynty | Burning" ("The Birth of Sweat") – 7:34
 "Läheltä | A Brief Passing Moment" ("From Near") – 6:49
The songs are sung in Finnish but each song has an English version printed in the booklet. The versions are not direct translations (here indicated inside parentheses, if necessary).

Personnel
Ilmari Issakainen – Piano, drums and bass (presumably also acoustic guitar and synthesizer)
Tyko Saarikko – Lead vocals
Janina Lehto – Backing vocals
Tuukka Tolvanen – Backing vocals
Compositions, lyrics, arrangements, cover artwork, recording, producing and mixing credited collectively to the band.

Tenhi albums
2004 albums